Lathyrus pauciflorus, known by the common name of few flowered peavine, is a perennial plant species in the Fabaceae family.

Description
The flowers are blue to purple, blooming early in spring, usually growing to at least 18 millimeters. The leaves are mostly greater than 3 centimeters. The keel is 2–4 mm shorter than the wing petals.

Distribution
This plant grows at lower elevations from sagebrush desert to Ponderosa pine forests east of the Cascade crest in Washington, Washington to California and east to Idaho and Arizona.

References

External links
 Lathyrus pauciflorus- Burke Herbarium Image Collection

pauciflorus
Flora of the Western United States
Flora of California
Flora of Oregon
Flora of Idaho
Flora of Arizona
Flora without expected TNC conservation status